Acrobasis erastriella is a species of snout moth in the genus Acrobasis. It was described by Émile Louis Ragonot in 1887. It is found in Azerbaijan.

References

Moths described in 1887
Acrobasis
Insects of Azerbaijan
Moths of Asia